Lonchocarpus phlebophyllus is a species of plant in the family Fabaceae. It is found in Costa Rica, Guatemala, Honduras, and Nicaragua.

References

phlebophyllus
Flora of Central America
Endangered plants
Taxonomy articles created by Polbot